Seimatosporium is a fungus genus within the family Sporocadaceae.

They are saprobic or pathogenic on plants, and are called 'pestalotioid fungi'. Seimatosporium physocarpi was found in Russia on the dead branches of Physocarpus opulifolius and Seimatosporium rosae was found on Rosa kalmiussica .

Due to morphological and DNA sequence data several species within the genus has been transferred to other genera within the family.

Species
As accepted by Species Fungorum;

Seimatosporium alneum 
Seimatosporium anomalum 
Seimatosporium azaleae 
Seimatosporium berberidicola 
Seimatosporium berckmansii 
Seimatosporium botan 
Seimatosporium cadicola 
Seimatosporium caninum 
Seimatosporium cassiopes 
Seimatosporium caudatum 
Seimatosporium ciliatum 
Seimatosporium consocium 
Seimatosporium corni 
Seimatosporium daviesiae 
Seimatosporium discosioides 
Seimatosporium effusum 
Seimatosporium etheridgei 
Seimatosporium fici 
Seimatosporium foliicola 
Seimatosporium germanicum 
Seimatosporium glandigenum 
Seimatosporium grammitum 
Seimatosporium grevilleae 
Seimatosporium hakeae 
Seimatosporium hebeiense 
Seimatosporium hollosii 
Seimatosporium hypericinum 
Seimatosporium hysterioides 
Seimatosporium ignobilis 
Seimatosporium italicum 
Seimatosporium kennediae 
Seimatosporium ledi 
Seimatosporium leucopogonis 
Seimatosporium lonicerae 
Seimatosporium luteosporum 
Seimatosporium macrospermum 
Seimatosporium mariae 
Seimatosporium massarina 
Seimatosporium missionum 
Seimatosporium monochaetioides 
Seimatosporium muehlenbeckiae 
Seimatosporium nipponicum 
Seimatosporium parasiticum 
Seimatosporium pestalozzioides 
Seimatosporium pezizoides 
Seimatosporium physocarpi 
Seimatosporium piceae 
Seimatosporium pistaciae 
Seimatosporium pleurochaetum 
Seimatosporium pseudocorni 
Seimatosporium pseudoglandigenum 
Seimatosporium pseudorosae 
Seimatosporium pseudorosarum 
Seimatosporium rhododendri 
Seimatosporium rhombisporum 
Seimatosporium ribis-alpini 
Seimatosporium rosae 
Seimatosporium rosigenum 
Seimatosporium rossicum 
Seimatosporium salicinum 
Seimatosporium soli 
Seimatosporium sublunatum 
Seimatosporium tostum 
Seimatosporium vaccinii 
Seimatosporium vitifusiforme 
Seimatosporium vitis 
Seimatosporium vitis-viniferae 

Former species;
 S. acerinum  = Sporocadus acerinus
 S. acutum  = Allelochaeta acuta
 S. arbuti  = Disaeta arbuti
 S. biseptatum  = Allelochaeta biseptata
 S. brevicentrum  = Allelochaeta brevicentra
 S. brevilatum  = Allelochaeta brevilata
 S. cornicola  = Sporocadus cornicola
 S. cylindrosporum  = Allelochaeta cylindrospora
 S. dacicum  = Sporocadus dacicus
 S. dilophosporum  = Allelochaeta dilophospora
 S. elegans  = Allelochaeta elegans
 S. eucalypti  = Allelochaeta eucalypti
 S. falcatum  = Allelochaeta falcata
 S. fusisporum  = Allelochaeta fusispora
 S. kriegerianum  = Allelochaeta kriegeriana
 S. laurinum  = Bartalinia laurina, Bartaliniaceae
 S. leptospermi  = Discostroma leptospermi
 S. lichenicola  = Discostroma corticola
 S. obtusum  = Allelochaeta obtusa
 S. orbiculare  = Allelochaeta orbicularis
 S. passerinii  = Seimatosporium tostum
 S. quercinum  = Xenoseimatosporium quercinum
 S. rhododendri  = Sarcostroma sinicum
 S. robillardoides  = Bartalinia robillardoides, Bartaliniaceae
 S. rosarum  = Sporocadus rosarum
 S. rosicola  = Sporocadus rosigena
 S. saksenaense  = Doliomyces saksenaensis, Amphisphaeriaceae
 S. samuelii  = Allelochaeta samuelii
 S. senegalense  = Doliomyces senegalensis, Amphisphaeriaceae
 S. sorbi  = Sporocadus sorbi
 S. verrucisporum  = Allelochaeta verrucispora
 S. walkeri  = Allelochaeta walkeri

External links 
 
 USDA ARS Fungal Database

References 

Fungal plant pathogens and diseases
Amphisphaeriales
Taxa named by August Carl Joseph Corda
Taxa described in 1833